Thomas Jasper may refer to:

Thomas Chilton Jasper (1844–1924), American businessman and Civil War fighter
Tom Jasper (born 1948), American college basketball player